King Sejong Institute is the brand name of Korean-language institutes established by the South Korean government around the world since 2007. The institute's name refers to Sejong the Great, the inventor of the Korean alphabet. As of June 2021, there were 234 King Sejong Institutes in 82 countries.

Background

Early Korean language teaching
Hangul, the Korean alphabet, is the written form of the official Korean language and has been used by Koreans since its creation in 1446 by Sejong the Great of the Joseon Dynasty. Most Korean language learning institutions outside Korea targeted second or third generation descendants of Korean immigrants, while Korean-language learners in South Korea were mostly foreign students, migrant workers, or spouses of Koreans.

Rising numbers of Korean learners
The last twenty years has seen a rise in interest and demand for the Korean language due to cultural and commercial globalisation and the Internet/Communications Revolution. International interest in Korean culture such as dramas and music has increased tremendously, especially in Asia, leading to what has been termed the "Korean Wave". This has been accompanied by an increase in foreign students studying in Korea. Demographically there has also been an increase in marriages between Koreans and foreigners.

With the increase in international cooperation and business, the South Korean government has been striving to standardize the names of locations, people, and other proper nouns in Hangul. Also, there was a need for more up-to-date Korean dictionaries, as most were made during the 1990s.

Establishment of "Sejonghakdang"

With such demand, the South Korean government established the concept of "Sejonghakdang" so as to provide integrated and standardised information and service for learning the Korean language as well as to coordinate and expand the institutes where people can learn or teach it. The Sejonghakdang will be developed as the brand commonly used by all Korean language education institutes. The South Korean government has recently launched its homepage at Sejonghakdang.org in Korean and English. Following enactment of Framework Act on National Language in 2011, the King Sejong Institute Foundation (KSIF) was founded in the following year as a central organisation responsible for running the Institutes and their programmes. Song Hyang-keun served as the first president of KSIF from October 2012 to July 2018 and Kang Hyounhwa serves its second president from September 2018.

Logo
Sejonghakdang is represented its symbol as shown. The shape <ㅎ> symbolizes hangul and the shape on the left shoulder of ㅎ means the name and the initial of each city where the institute is located. The example here is Sejonghakdang in Seoul (Hangul: 서울), having 'ㅅ' on the left shoulder which indicates the first hangul letter of '서울'.

Activities

Integration and expansion of Hangul Institutes
The South Korean government integrated the Korean Language Institutes being called with various names into one brand "Sejonghakdang". For a short-term strategy, the government is to encourage to use the name "Sejonghakdang" and the standard textbook and course, while reviewing a long-term strategy to run an integrated language institute.

144 institutes have been established by the year 2016. Nine more institutes have been newly established in countries such as Latvia, Myanmar, Bahrain. In 2018, a new institute was added in the United States in Irvine, California.  
The "Sejonghakdang" headquarters office was established in 2012 to systematically support the institutes around the world. The office works to be the focal point that connects the institutes around the world.

Nuri-Sejonghakdang
Nuri-Sejonghakdang is a website providing a remote education system and integrated information service related to Korean language study for Hangul learners and teachers. It is a Korean study website built jointly by various ministries within the South Korean government, including the Ministry of Culture, Sports and Tourism, Ministry of Education, Science, and Technology, Ministry of Foreign Affairs and Trade, Ministry of Health and Welfare, Ministry of Justice, and National Institute of the Korean Language, National Institute for International Education, The Overseas Koreans Foundation and International Korean Language Foundation with Presidential Council on Nation Branding as the main contributor.

Nuri-Sejonghakdang followed a three-step plan from 2009 to 2011 as below.

Nuri-Sejonghakdang provides its services to Korean language institutes throughout the world, foreigners who wish to learn the Korean language, and teachers and future teachers of the Korean language. It is still collecting and developing its contents to expand the online study courses and building multi-language versions of the website for users all around the world. The multi-language version is completed.

Locations
As of June 2021, there were 234 institutions established in 82 countries around the world.

Asia
 Saudi Arabia 1 (Riyadh
 Azerbaijan 2 (Baku and Khirdalan)
 Armenia 1 (Yerevan)
 Bahrain 1 (Manama)
 Cambodia 2 (Poipet and Siem Reap)
 China 19 (Beijing, Chengdu, Dalian, Hangzhou, Harbin, Hong Kong, Kunming, Linyi, Qingdao, Qiqihar, Shanghai, Shijiazhuang, Wenzhou, Wuhan, Xi'an, Yanbian, Yancheng and Yantai)
 India 8 (Barasat, Bengaluru, Chennai 1, Imphal, New Delhi, Patna and Chennai 2
 Indonesia 7 (Bandung, Jakarta, Surabaya, Tangerang and Yogyakarta)
 Iran 2 (Isfahan and Tehran)
 Japan 16 (Chiba, Fukuoka, Hiroshima, Kanagawa, Kobe, Kyoto, Okayama, Osaka, Nagano, Nara, Saitama, Sapporo, Sendai, Shimonoseki and Tokyo)
 Jordan 1 (Amman)
 Kazakhstan 3 (Almaty, Astana and Shymkent)
 Kyrgyzstan 5 (Bishkek, Osh and Sokuluk)
 Laos 2 (Phonsavan and Vientian)
 Malaysia 3 (Bangi, Kuala Lumpur and Melaka)
 Mongolia 4 (Darkhan and Ulaanbaatar)
 Myanmar 1 (Yangon)
 Nepal 1 (Kathmandu)
 Pakistan 1 (Islamabad)
 Palestine 1 (Ramallah)
 Philippines 6 (Balanga, Cainta, Cebu City, Iloilo City, San Juan and Taguig)
 Georgia 1 (Tbilisi)
 Sri Lanka 2 (Colombo and Kandy)
 Taiwan 3 (Kaoshiung, Tainan and Taipei)
 Tajikistan 1 (Dushanbe)
 Thailand 5 (Bangkok, Chiang Mai and Maha Sarakham)
 Turkmenistan 1 (Ashgabat)
 UAE 2 (Abu Dhabi, Ajman and Dubai)
 Uzbekistan 7 (Denau, Ferghana, Namangan, Samarkand and Tashkent)
 Vietnam 22 (Biên Hòa, Binh Duong, Cần Thơ, Da Lat, Da Nang, Haiphong, Hanoi, Ho Chi Minh City, Huế, Hưng Yên, Quy Nhơn, Thái Nguyên and Trà Vinh)

Africa
 Algeria 1 (Algiers)
 Botswana 1 (Gaborone)
 Egypt 1 (Cairo)
 Eswatini 1 (Mbabane)
 Ethiopia 1 (Addis Ababa)
 Ivory Coast 1 (Abidjan)
 Kenya 1 (Nairobi)
 Madagascar 1 (Antananarivo)
 Morocco 1 (Rabat)
 Nigeria 1 (Abuja)
 Tanzania 1 (Dar es Salaam)
 Tunisia 1 (Ariana)
 Uganda 1 (Kumi)

Americas
 Argentina 1 (Buenos Aires)
 Brazil 5 (Brasília, Campinas, São Leopoldo and São Paulo)
 Bolivia 1 (La Paz)
 Canada 3 (Montreal, Ottawa and Waterloo)
 Chile 1 (Santiago)
 Colombia 1 (Bogotá)
 Costa Rica 1 (San José)
 Ecuador 2 (Guayaquil and Quito)
 El Salvador 1 (San Salvador)
 Guatemala 1 (Guatemala City)
 Haiti 1 (Caracol)
 Mexico 1 (Mexico City)
 Paraguay 1 (Asunción)
 United States 13 (Auburn, Bloomington, Chicago, Houston, Iowa City, Irvine, Los Angeles, San Antonio, San Francisco, Upland and Washington, D.C.)
 Uruguay 1 (Montevideo)

Europe
 Belarus 1 (Minsk)
 Belgium 2 (Brussels)
 Bulgaria 1 (Sofia)
 Croatia 1 (Zagreb)
 Czech Republic 1 (Olomouc)
 Denmark 1 (Copenhagen)
 Estonia 1 (Tallinn)
 France 3 (La Rochelle, Paris and Quimper)
 Germany 2 (Berlin and Tübingen)
 Hungary 3 (Budapest and Debrecen)
 Italy 1 (Rome)
 Latvia 1 (Riga)
 Lithuania 2 (Kaunas and Vilnius)
 Poland 2 (Poznań and Warsaw)
 Portugal 1 (Lisbon)
 Romania 1 (Bucharest)
 Russia 11 (Astrakhan, Khabarovsk, Moscow, Rostov-on-Don, Saint Petersburg, Ulan-Ude, Vladivostok, Yakutsk and Yuzhno-Sakhalinsk)
 Serbia 1 (Novi Sad)
 Slovakia 1 (Bratislava)
 Slovenia 1 (Ljubljana)
 Spain 3 (Barcelona, Las Palmas and Madrid)
 Sweden 1 (Gothenburg)
 Turkey 5 (Ankara, Bursa, Istanbul and Izmir)
 Ukraine 1 (Dnipro)
 United Kingdom 5 (London, Preston and Staffordshire)

Oceania
 Australia 3 (Adelaide and Sydney)
 New Zealand 1 (Auckland)

References

External links
 King Sejong Institute
 King Sejong Institute Foundation

Organizations established in 2007
Government agencies of South Korea
Foreign relations of South Korea
Korean language
Language schools in South Korea
Korean-language education
Sejong the Great